Dyseuaresta fuscoapicalis is a species of tephritid or fruit flies in the genus Dyseuaresta of the family Tephritidae.

Distribution
Argentina.

References

Tephritinae
Insects described in 1942
Diptera of South America